Adolfo Albino Mourão (born 29 June 1912 in Algés - deceased 14 June 1981), former Portuguese footballer who played for Sporting and the Portugal national team, as forward.

International career 

Mourão made his national team debut 11 March 1934 in Madrid, in a 0-9 defeat against Spain. He gained 15 caps and scored 2 goals.

External links 
 
 

1912 births
Sporting CP footballers
Portugal international footballers
Portuguese footballers
Primeira Liga players
1981 deaths
Association football forwards